The rubiscolins are a group of opioid peptides that are formed during digestion of the ribulose bisphosphate carboxylase/oxygenase (Rubisco) protein from spinach leaves. These peptides have much in common with the better-known gluten exorphins.

Types of Rubiscolin
There are 2 known rubiscolins with known structure:

Rubiscolin-5
Structure: H-Tyr-Pro-Leu-Asp-Leu-OH

Rubiscolin-6
Function: can have an anxiolytic effect via activation of sigma1 and dopamine D1 receptors.
Structure: H-Tyr-Pro-Leu-Asp-Leu-Phe-OH

Studies on Rubiscolin 
Studies have been conducted on rubiscolin structure and biological responses following its digestion. The tertiary structure and biological function of spinach-derived rubiscolin has been analyzed in the laboratory. When rubiscolin is digested, studies have shown that rubiscolin has the potential to bind to δ opioid receptors in the body. The analysis of the amino acids responsible for this agonistic relationship of rubiscolin with δ opioid receptors can lead to replication of these proteins in the lab. Rubiscolin has the capability to bind to δ opioid receptors following its digestion. Upon the digestion of rubiscolin from spinach with the protease pepsin, peptides MRWRD, MRW, LRIPVA, AND IAYKPAG were found and purified. These peptides were found to have binding capabilities with angiotensin I-converting enzyme (ACE), which catalyze an antihypertensive, or decreased blood pressure, response. When treated to rats in the laboratory, MRW, MRWRD, and IAYKPAG resulted in antihypertensive responses in hypertensive rats 2 hours, 4 hours, and 4 hours, respectively, after ingestion of the peptides. The peptide LRIPVA did not induce any antihypertensive responses from laboratory rats. The tertiary structure of rubiscolin has been mapped and the δ opioid receptor and ACE binding capabilities have been researched in the lab.

References

External links
 
 

Opioid peptides